Rolf Zacher (28 March 1941 – 3 February 2018) was a German actor.

Life and career
Zacher appeared in about 190 films and television shows between 1961 and 2016, often in illustrious or eccentric character roles. He starred in the 1971 film Jaider, der einsame Jäger, which was entered into the 21st Berlin International Film Festival.

He won the Deutscher Filmpreis for portraying a criminal in Reinhard Hauff's film drama  (1980). A film critic once called Zacher the "best small-time criminal of German cinema".

In 2016, Zacher appeared in Ich bin ein Star – Holt mich hier raus!, the German version of I'm a Celebrity...Get Me Out of Here!, but had to leave after eight days for medical reasons. He died at a nursing home in Büdelsdorf on 3 February 2018 at the age of 76.

Selected filmography

References

External links

1941 births
2018 deaths
20th-century German male actors
21st-century German male actors
German autobiographers
German male film actors
German male television actors
Male actors from Berlin
German male non-fiction writers
German Film Award winners
Ich bin ein Star – Holt mich hier raus! participants